Henry Augustus Reeves (December 7, 1832 – March 4, 1916) was an American lawyer and politician who served one term as a U.S. Representative from New York from 1869 to 1871.

Biography 
Born in Sag Harbor, New York, Reeves attended private schools in Sag Harbor, the Southampton Academy, the University of Michigan at Ann Arbor for three years, and  graduated from Union College, Schenectady, New York, in 1852. He studied law. He was admitted to the bar.

He edited the Republican Watchman in Greenport from 1858 until his death.

Congress 
Reeves was elected as a Democrat to the Forty-first Congress (March 4, 1869 – March 3, 1871). He resumed newspaper interests.

Later career and death 
He was the supervisor of Southold Town from 1872 to 1894. He was a member of the New York State Assembly (Suffolk Co.) in 1887. He served as member of the State commission in lunacy from 1889 to 1897.

He died in Greenport, New York on March 4, 1916. He was interred in Southampton Cemetery, Southampton, New York.

Sources

1832 births
1916 deaths
University of Michigan alumni
Union College (New York) alumni
Democratic Party members of the New York State Assembly
Democratic Party members of the United States House of Representatives from New York (state)
People from Sag Harbor, New York
People from Greenport, Suffolk County, New York
19th-century American politicians